The Battle of the Trench was fought near Tripolitsa in Arcadia in August 1821 between the Greek revolutionary forces led by Theodoros Kolokotronis and the Ottoman garrison of Tripolitsa during the first year of the Greek War of Independence. The battle ended with the complete victory of the Greeks.

Prelude
In August 1821, the Greeks began the siege of Tripolitsa. The Ottomans who were besieged in the city attempted several night sallies in order to find supplies. When Theodoros Kolokotronis was called by the Greek revolutionaries to take over command of the siege, he ordered the digging of a trench (grana) one meter deep and two meters wide running from Mytikas in the village of Benteni up to the hill near the village of Loukas where the chieftain Ioannis Dagres held the position. This entire project designed to intercept the Ottoman sorties covering a distance of approximately 700 meters, was completed by the peasants of the region in three days.

Battle
During the night of 9–10 August, an Ottoman force of 3,000 infantry and cavalrymen sallied from Tripolitsa to Loukas hill in order to attack the force of Ioannis Dagres and also for their usual raid for supplies. After looting several villages in the wider area, they attacked Dagres' force at dawn, putting the Greeks in a difficult position. Kolokotronis, realising the seriousness of the situation, ordered Plapoutas, Dimitrios Deligiannis, Papazafiropoulos, Christopoulos, George Aulakos  and the armed Greeks of Tripolitsa to occupy positions within the trench, while he placed other forces behind the fences of the vineyards, as well as ordering other troops to come to assistance. Moreover, in order to lessen the pressure on the trench, he ordered a diversionary attack by the forces of Demetrios Ypsilantis, Anagnostaras and Panagiotis Giatrakos.

While the forces of Ali Bey had put Dagres and his men in a difficult position, they realised the imminent danger and retreated in order to avoid being cut off.  As they attempted to withdraw, they found themselves being pursued and came upon the Greeks positioned in the trench.

Although the position of the retreating Turks was perilous, their situation temporarily improved when the garrison cavalry came to their aid. Both the Turkish foot soldiers and the cavalry, however, suffered heavy losses as they tried to cross the trench. At the same time, additional Turkish forces left Tripolitsa attempting to rescue their comrades, leading to a general engagement on two fronts. Kolokotronis, followed by his bodyguard, moved between fronts encouraging his men.  Eventually, the Turks caved in and retreated in disorder towards Tripolitsa.

Losses
During the battle, the Ottomans lost about 400 men. Most of the Turks were killed during the failed attempt to cross the trench. Among the dead were several prominent Ottomans of Tripolitsa such as Abdul Bölükbaşı (son of the local lord Sheikh Tahir Efendi) and Kabır Kehaya. Ali Bey also died of his wounds three days after the battle. The Turks also abandoned and lost on the battlefield that day all of their animal carts and provisions.

On the Greek side, thirty men were killed, including the brother of Ioannis Dagres, Thanasis. There were also numerous men wounded, including the minor leaders Apostolis Kolokotronis and Georgios Dritsas, who died a few days later.

Aftermath
The successful outcome of this battle for the Greek forces, contributed greatly to the acceleration of the subsequent capture of Tripolitsa by the Greek revolutionaries. The Ottomans suffered considerable losses and the ability to forage which caused a sharp decline in morale.

Notes

Citations

References

 
  

Battles of the Greek War of Independence
Conflicts in 1821
1821 in Greece
Tripoli, Greece
Ottoman Peloponnese
History of Arcadia, Peloponnese
August 1821 events
Peloponnese in the Greek War of Independence